Cancilla schepmani is a species of sea snail, a marine gastropod mollusk in the family Mitridae, the miters or miter snails.

The specific name schepmani is in honor of Dutch malacologist Mattheus Marinus Schepman.

Description

Distribution
This marine species occurs off New Caledonia and Sulu Island, Indonesia

References

External links
 Schepman M.M. (1911) The Prosobranchia of the Siboga Expedition. Part IV. Rachiglossa. Siboga-Expeditie, 49d: 247-363, pls. 18–24. Leiden, E.J. Brill.
 Salisbury R. & Guillot de Suduiraut E. 2003. Three new deep-water miters (Gastropoda: Prosobranchia: Mitridae) from the Western Indo-Pacific with a new name for Mitra millepunctata Schepman, 1911. Novapex 4(1): 1-9
 Fedosov A., Puillandre N., Herrmann M., Kantor Yu., Oliverio M., Dgebuadze P., Modica M.V. & Bouchet P. (2018). The collapse of Mitra: molecular systematics and morphology of the Mitridae (Gastropoda: Neogastropoda). Zoological Journal of the Linnean Society. 183(2): 253-337

Mitridae
Gastropods described in 2003